Staňkov is a town in Domažlice District in the Plzeň Region of the Czech Republic. It has about 3,300 inhabitants.

Administrative parts
Staňkov is made up of town parts of Staňkov I and Staňkov II, and villages of Krchleby, Ohučov and Vránov.

Geography
It lies in the Plasy Uplands. The town is situated on the Radbuza River.

History
The first written mention of village of Staňkov is from 1233. The market town of Staňkov was a separate settlement first mentioned in 1367. In 1271 the village was sold to Chotěšov Abbey and both the village and the market town were its property until 1425.

Staňkov village and Staňkov market town existed separately until 1938, when they were merged into one municipality. In 1960, Staňkov became a town.

During the World War II, the metalworks in Staňkov were accidentally bombed by the RAF on 28 October 1940 when they were mistaken for the nearby Škoda Works.

Demographics

Transport
The I/26 road from Plzeň to the Czech-German border runs through Staňkov.

Sights

The Church of Saint James the Great is originally a Gothic church from the beginning of the 15th century. The Baroque tower was built in 1673.

The town hall is a late Baroque building from the 18th century.

Notable people
Josef Mathauser (1846–1917), painter

References

External links

Cities and towns in the Czech Republic
Populated places in Domažlice District